Governor Turner may refer to:

Charles Turner (British Army officer) (died 1826), Governor-in-Chief of Sierra Leone from 1825 to 1826
Christopher J. Turner (1933–2014), Governor of the Turks and Caicos from 1982 to 1987 and Governor of Montserrat from 1987 to 1990
Dan W. Turner (1877–1969), 25th Governor of Iowa
James Turner (North Carolina politician) (1766–1824), 12th Governor of North Carolina
Roy J. Turner (1894–1973), 13th Governor of Oklahoma
Thomas G. Turner (1810–1875), 26th Governor of Rhode Island
Tomkyns Hilgrove Turner (1764–1843), Governor of Bermuda from 1826 to 1832